This is a list of school districts in the schools U.S. state of Florida.

Alachua County Public Schools
Baker County School District
Bay District Schools
Bradford County School District
Brevard County Public Schools
Broward County Public Schools
Calhoun County School District
Charlotte County Public Schools
Citrus County School District
Clay County Schools
Collier County District School Board
Columbia County School District
DeSoto School District
Dixie County School District
Dozier/Okeechobee School District (operates Okeechobee Youth Development Center)
Duval County Public Schools
Escambia County School District
Flagler County Public Schools
Franklin County School District (Florida)
Gadsden County School District
Gilchrist County School District
Glades County School District
Gulf County Schools
Hamilton County School District
Hardee County School District
Hendry County Schools
Hernando County School Board
Highlands County Schools
Hillsborough County Public Schools
Holmes County School District
Indian River County School District
Jackson County School District
Jefferson County School District
Lafayette County School District (Florida)
Lake County Schools
Lee County School District
Leon County Schools
Levy County School Board
Liberty County School District
Madison County Schools
Manatee County School District
Marion County Public Schools
Martin County School District
Miami-Dade County Public Schools
Monroe County School District
Nassau County School District
Okaloosa County School District
Okeechobee County School Board
Orange County Public Schools
Osceola County School District
Palm Beach County School District
Pasco County Schools
Pinellas County Schools
Polk County Public Schools
Putnam County School District (Florida)
St. Johns County School District
St. Lucie County School Board
Santa Rosa County School District
Sarasota County Public Schools
Seminole County Public Schools
Sumter District Schools
Suwannee County School District
Taylor County School District (Florida)
Union County School Board
Volusia County Schools
Wakulla County School Board
Walton County School District (Florida)
Washington County School District

See also
List of high schools in Florida
List of charter schools in Florida

External links
List of Florida school districts from the Florida Department of Education

 
School districts
Florida
School districts